The Industrial Development Bureau, MOEA (IDB) is the administrative agency of the Ministry of Economic Affairs of Republic of China. The economy of Taiwan has achieved Industrialized Economy (IE) status (which includes economies with adjusted manufacturing value added (MVA) per capita higher than $2,500 (PPP international dollars) or a gross domestic product per capita higher than $20,000 (international PPP)) as defined by UNIDO, and Taiwan is included in the UNIDO's Competitive Industrial Performance Index (CIP) and ranked 8th overall in UNIDO's Industrial Development Report among global economies in 2022.

Organizational structure
 Industrial Policy Division
 Metal and Mechanical Industries Division
 Information Technology Industries Division
 Consumer Goods and Chemical Industries Division
 Knowledge Services Division
 Sustainable Development Division
 Industrial Parks Division
 ICP Office

Branch offices
 Central Region Office
 Southern Region Office

Director-Generals
 Wei Yung-ning
 Hsu Kuo-an
 Yang Shih-chien
 Wang Chueh-ming
 Yiin Chii-ming
 Wang Ya-kang
 Shih Yen-shiang
 Chen Chao-yih 
 Woody Duh
 Shen Jong-chin (June 2012–February 2014)
 Wu Ming-ji
 Leu Jang-hwa (August 2017–August 2022)
 Lien Ching-Chang (August 2022~)

Transportation
The agency is accessible within walking distance East from Dongmen Station of Taipei Metro.

References

Executive Yuan
Industry in Taiwan